The Centre for Open Learning (COL) the home of Short Courses, English Language Education, International Foundation Programme, Summer School, Winter School and Access programme at the University of Edinburgh. The Centre is based at Paterson's Land on the University of Edinburgh's Holyrood Campus.

History
The Office of Lifelong Learning (OLL) was a school within the College of Humanities and Social Science. The buildings of the Office of Lifelong Learning were located on Buccleuch Place in the Central Campus adjacent to George Square in Edinburgh. In 2012, the Centre moved to its current location at Paterson's Land on the University's Holyrood Campus. 

In 2008, OLL merged with the Institute of Applied Language Studies. In 2011, the English Language Teaching Centre joined the Centre. In April 2016, it was renamed the Centre for Open Learning.

References

External links 
 Centre for Open Learning

Schools of the University of Edinburgh
Education in Edinburgh